Peter Hardy, Baron Hardy of Wath  (17 July 1931 – 16 December 2003) was a British Labour Party politician.

Early life
The son of a Wath-upon-Dearne miner, Hardy was educated at Wath Grammar School. He trained as a teacher at Westminster College, London, and gained a degree in Curricular Studies at Sheffield University before rising to be head of English at Mexborough County Secondary School.

Political career
While a local councillor, he stood unsuccessfully as a parliamentary candidate in several safe Conservative seats - in 1964 he contested Scarborough and Whitby, and in 1966 he fought Sheffield Hallam.

He entered parliament in 1970 for the Rother Valley constituency.  In 1983, when constituency boundaries were re-organised, he moved with a part of his old Rother Valley constituency to the re-formed Wentworth constituency, for which he was Member of Parliament (MP) until retirement from the House of Commons in 1997.

Never keen on the pursuit of high office, he was parliamentary private secretary to Tony Crosland and David Owen.  To his constituents he was a popular and hard-working constituency MP.  This was reflected in the fact that, despite being identified with the right wing of the Labour party, in 1981 he survived a National Union of Mineworkers-directed attempt to force the local party in his mining constituency to deselect him as its parliamentary candidate in favour of a more left-wing candidate.

His main interests were the lot of the classroom teacher, and wildlife, of which he had an encyclopaedic knowledge.  He was a sponsor of much wildlife-related legislation in parliament, including the Badger Act (1973) and the Wild Creatures and Wild Plants Act (1975). During an all-night reading of the Felixstowe Docks Bill he regaled the Commons with impressions of the song birds whose habitats were supposedly threatened by the development.

House of Lords
On 27 September 1997 he was made a life peer as Baron Hardy of Wath, of Wath-upon-Dearne in the County of South Yorkshire and was an active member of the House of Lords until shortly before his death.

Other interests
Outside parliament, he served on the council of the Royal Society for the Protection of Birds and the NSPCC.
He is the author of "A Lifetime of Badgers" Newton Abbot: David & Charles: 1975

References

External links
Obituary in the Daily Telegraph

1931 births
2003 deaths
Deputy Lieutenants of South Yorkshire
Hardy of Wath
Life peers created by Elizabeth II
Labour Party (UK) MPs for English constituencies
UK MPs 1983–1987
UK MPs 1970–1974
UK MPs 1974
UK MPs 1974–1979
UK MPs 1979–1983
UK MPs 1987–1992
UK MPs 1992–1997
People from Wath upon Dearne
People educated at Wath Academy
National Society for the Prevention of Cruelty to Children people